Funa asra is a species of sea snail, a marine gastropod mollusk in the family Pseudomelatomidae, the turrids and allies.

Description
The length of the shell varies between 45 mm and 60 mm.

Distribution
This marine species occurs off KwaZulu Natal, South Africa, and Mozambique.

References

 Kilburn R.N. (1988). Turridae (Mollusca: Gastropoda) of southern Africa and Mozambique. Part 4. Subfamilies Drillinae, Crassispirinae and Strictispirinae. Annals of the Natal Museum. 29(1): 167-320

External links
 
 

asra
Gastropods described in 1988